The deputy mayor of Toronto is a member of Toronto City Council appointed to assist the mayor of Toronto. One councillor is designated for statutory purposes and additional deputy mayors may be appointed to represent the mayor on an honourary basis, but with no statutory authority.

Jennifer McKelvie has served as the statutory deputy mayor since her appointment by Mayor John Tory on November 16, 2023. Additional deputy mayors have not been appointed in the 2022–2026 council term.

Statutory deputy mayor 
The member designated for statutory purposes is known as the first deputy mayor. This councillor performs the roles and functions assigned to the "deputy mayor" in various chapters of the municipal code. The statutory deputy mayor has all the rights, power and authority of the mayor created by council, and is the vice-chair of the executive committee. The statutory deputy mayor typically acts when the mayor is unable to.

Role during mayoral vacancy 
When the office of Mayor of Toronto is vacant, the deputy mayor exercises the limited mayoral powers which are granted to the mayor by city council to ensure city business can continue to be carried out. This includes acting as the city's chief executive officer, representing the city, and special privileges during council sessions. The deputy mayor also assumes responsibility for the administrative management of the mayor's office.

The deputy mayor does not become "acting" or "interim" mayor, nor does the deputy mayor assume the "strong-mayor" powers, which are granted by the province to the head of council, a role which remains vacant.

Additional deputy mayors 
Non-statutory deputy mayors could be appointed to serve ceremonial roles. While holding no statutory authority, they represent the mayor at local events, can act as advisors, or lead a policy file. Additional deputy mayors were appointed under mayors David Miller and John Tory.

History

List of deputy mayors of Toronto

See also 
 List of mayors of Toronto

References

External links 

 Office of the Mayor website

Municipal government of Toronto